Andile Lungisa (born 21 December 1979 in Tsomo, Chris Hani District Municipality in the Eastern Cape) is a South African politician and the former deputy president of the African National Congress Youth League (ANCYL). Lungisa is also the former chairperson of the National Youth Development Agency (NYDA) of South Africa as well as the former President of the Pan-African Youth Union (PYU) and councillor of the ANC at the Nelson Mandela Bay Metropolitan Municipality in Port Elizabeth. He was released from prison on 1 December 2020 after serving only two months of his two-year prison sentence for assaulting an opposition councillor during a brawl in a council session.

Career

Early political career

Lungisa became active in politics from the age of 14 through the South African Students Congress (SASCO) in the early 1990s. He was later elected chairperson of SASCO in the region, which includes Port Elizabeth and Grahamstown. In 1998, Lungisa started an ANCYL branch in the western suburbs of Port Elizabeth called 'City Central', and became its executive committee member. In 2001, he was elected deputy regional chairperson of the Nelson Mandela Bay ANC region.

2008 - present

Lungisa was elected as the deputy president of the ANC Youth League in April 2008.  He was elected to deputise Julius Malema who got elected president at the conference held in Mangaung. Vuyiswa Tulelo was elected national secretary-general, Steve Ngubeni the deputy secretary-general and Pule Mabe as treasurer-general.

In 2009, Lungisa was supported by the ANCYL to go serve as the first chairperson of the newly established National Youth Development Agency (NYDA) when nominations for candidates opened in March 2009, a position he held from April 2009 until April 2013 when Yershen Pillay took over.

Lungisa was elected president of the Pan-African Youth Union (PYU) in a conference that took place from 2 to 5 December 2011 in Khartoum, Sudan. He had been vice president of the structure for a three-year term.

He currently serves as a councillor for the Nelson Mandela Metropolitan Municipality. He was appointed the Member of the Mayoral Committee responsible for the municipal Department of Infrastructure and Engineering in August 2020.

He was elected as the regional chairperson of the ANC in the Nelson Mandela region in 2017 but resigned shortly afterwards when the national executive committee (NEC) found that he broke the ANC Constitution for contesting on a regional level while serving as provincial executive committee (PEC) member.

Controversies

In October 2013, Lungisa and three others appeared before the Johannesburg Specialised Commercial Crime Court over allegations of fraud and money-laundering relating to a R2.5 million paid by the Department of Arts and Culture for the 'Nelson Mandela Sports Day concert'. They allegedly promised that US singer R Kelly would perform at the concert, but he did not. Later it was discovered that R Kelly's management had been unaware of the event. Their case was withdrawn in October 2016.

In March 2017, Lungisa was asked to resign as Nelson Mandela ANC region chairperson having been in the position for less than a week. In terms of ANC Constitution, Lungisa was supposed to resign first as Eastern Cape ANC provincial executive committee (PEC) member before contesting on a lower level. Lungisa resigned as a Member of Mayoral Committee on 2 August 2020 after attending a disciplinary hearing. He remains a municipal councillor.

In April 2018, Lungisa was found guilty of assault with the intent to cause grievous bodily harm for hitting DA councillor Rano Kayser over the head with a glass water jug during a heated council meeting in October 2016. The incident was caught on camera and Lungisa was sentenced to 2 years. He said he acted in self-defense but Judge Morne Cannon of the Port Elizabeth Magistrates Court, said Lungisa changed his versions throughout the trial and his evidence could not be trusted.

He began serving a prison sentence in September 2020 when the Supreme Court of Appeal dismissed his appeal On 25 September he was granted bail in the amount of R10,000 pending a Constitutional Court bid, but elected to remain in prison.

On 23 July 2021, he appeared in the Motherwell Magistrates Court to face charges that he allegedly contravened COVID-19 lockdown regulations on 2 July. He was released with a warning, and the case was postponed to 29 July 2021. At his initial hearing on 29 July, the National Prosecuting Authority (NPA) stated that the case would be postponed to 26 October for plea and trial. After Lungisa failed to appear in court on 26 October, the NPA announced that the trial would commence on 18 November.

References

External links
- Andile Lungisa | Professional Political Expertise

Members of the African National Congress
1979 births
Living people